Peter Leslie Wallace is an Australian-born Filipino businessman and business columnist who started his professional career as an electrical engineer. He built a factory manufacturing maintenance products in the Philippines in 1975 for an American multi-national company. Subsequently, he accepted the position of Chairman of a conglomerate, Columbian Philippines, Inc., and later was CEO of Getz Corporation, the largest trading company at the time.

In 1982, he founded his own company, the Wallace Business Forum. He became a Filipino citizen in 2015. He is a regular opinion columnist for the Philippine Daily Inquirer since 2012.

In 2019, Wallace was appointed by President Rodrigo Duterte as member of the Ease of Doing Business and Anti-Red Tape Council of the Department of Trade and Industry (DTI).

See also

 List of naturalized Filipino citizens

References

External links
 Peter Wallace Archives at Philippine Daily Inquirer.

Australian columnists
Filipino columnists
Living people
1939 births